Scenic Routes is an album by roots music band Lost Dogs, released on BAI Records in 1992.

The album began as a one time recording effort from the frontmen of four creative rock bands; Gene Eugene, from the funk/rock band, Adam Again; Terry Scott Taylor, from the bands Daniel Amos and The Swirling Eddies; Mike Roe, from the rock band The 77s; and Derri Daugherty, from the atmospheric rock band The Choir.

Track listing
 "Scenic Routes" (Words by Taylor, Music by Daugherty)  (2:28)
 "You Gotta Move" (Traditional, Arranged by Roe)  (3:53)
 "Built For Glory, Made To Last" (Taylor)  (5:28)
 "Bullet Train" (Taylor)  (5:23)
 "The Fortunate Sons" (Words by Eugene/Taylor, Music by Eugene)  (4:36)
 "The New Physics" (Roe/Mascoli)  (4:05)
 "I Am A Pilgrim" (Traditional, Arranged by The Lost Dogs)  (3:40)
 "Lord Protect My Child" (Bob Dylan, Arranged by the Lost Dogs)  (4:53)
 "Amber Waves Goodbye" (Taylor)  (3:53)
 "Bush League" (Words by Eugene/Taylor, Music by Eugene)  (1:53)
 "Old And Lonesome" (Roe, Adapted from Jimmy Reed's "Cold and Lonesome")  (4:53)
 "I Can't Say Goodbye" (Eugene)  (5:00)
 "Why Is The Devil Red?" (The Lost Dogs)  (2:51)
 "Smokescreen" (Roe)  (2:27)
 "The Last Testament of Angus Shane" (Words by Taylor, Music by Eugene)  (4:09)
 "Hard Times Come Again No More" (Stephen Foster, Arranged by The Lost Dogs)  (2:13)
 "Breathe Deep" (Taylor)  (3:33)

The band
Derri Daugherty — guitars and vocals
Gene Eugene — guitars, piano and vocals
Mike Roe — guitars and vocals
Terry Scott Taylor — guitars and vocals

Additional musicians
Burleigh Drummond — drums and percussion
Greg Kellog — dobro, banjo and pedal steel
James Sitterly — violin

Production notes
Most of the music on this album was recorded during two weekends in October 1991, played live in the lounge of Mixing Lab 'B', in Huntington Beach, California.
The vocals and a few overdubs were recorded in January 1992 at McCrummy Studio in Whittier, California.
It was mixed later in the month at Mixing Lab 'A' in Garden Grove, California and at Pakaderm Studio 'A' in Los Alamitos, California.
Engineered by Gene, with Rob Watson, Terry and Derri.
Art Direction and all photography by Anna Cardenas.
Art Production and Layout by FineGraphics.

References

Lost Dogs albums
1992 debut albums